Relics (subtitle: A Bizarre Collection of Antiques & Curios) is a 1971 compilation album by English progressive rock band Pink Floyd. The album was released in the UK on 14 May 1971 and in the United States on the following day. Initially released by Starline, the compilation was reissued by Music for Pleasure in the United Kingdom, while Harvest and Capitol distributed the album in the United States. A remastered CD was released in 1996 with a different album cover, picturing a three-dimensional model based on the sketch drawn by drummer Nick Mason for the album's initial release.

Release
The release of Relics occurred because the band's record company, EMI, were concerned that they had gone into the studio to record what would become Meddle without any songs or ideas, effectively starting from scratch. This, combined with their ever-increasing touring schedule, made EMI realise that no new product would be released for some time, possibly not until well over a year after completing their previous album, Atom Heart Mother. In order to issue some more "product" for fans, they decided to release a budget priced LP on their Starline label, combining early singles, B-sides, album tracks and one unreleased song, "Biding My Time". The compilation contains material from the first three albums: The Piper at the Gates of Dawn, A Saucerful of Secrets and More.

Relics has been re-released on numerous occasions, and at times without the proper authority. One such incident involved EMI Australia releasing the album without the band's consent. This led to the LP being withdrawn and, as a result, the album became a rarity. Relics was made readily available again when it was officially issued on CD in 1996.

Relics was reissued again on CD on 17 June 2016, featuring the original sketch artwork cover and containing the same mastering as the 1996 edition.

Mixes
Relics was most noted for its inclusion of the band's first two Syd Barrett-era hit singles, "Arnold Layne" and "See Emily Play". Due to the lack of available stereo masters, both tracks were reprocessed into Duophonic stereo for the album's original release (the 1996 CD release reverts to the original mono mixes). Also included were the B-sides of the three follow-up singles, with the tracks "Paint Box", "Julia Dream" and "Careful with That Axe, Eugene" appearing in true stereo. Relics has the only CD release of "Paint Box" that has the same length (3:33) that the original single version had; on the albums  The Early Singles (1992, part of Shine On), 1967: The First Three Singles (1997), and the 40th anniversary edition of The Piper at the Gates of Dawn (2007), it fades out about 13 seconds later.

The album was not a definitive collection of non-album material, as several single A-sides were omitted ("Apples and Oranges," "It Would Be So Nice" and "Point Me at the Sky"), as well as one B-side ("Candy and a Currant Bun"). Until this was rectified with the release of The Early Singles (1992), it was left to the 1970 "The Best of Pink Floyd" / "Masters of Rock" compilations and bootlegs such as The Dark Side of the Moo to plug the gap on lp.

"Biding My Time" 
The album also includes a previously unreleased studio recording of a Roger Waters composition, "Biding My Time". The song originally was titled "Afternoon" which had been heard by live audiences as part of the Man and the Journey concert sequence. Following the sessions for Ummagumma, it was reworked as "Biding My Time", before being held over for two years until the release of Relics. Unusually, Wright plays trombone on this track.

Cover and machine
The album cover was designed by drummer Nick Mason, and was inspired by his time studying architecture at the Regent Street Polytechnic. In 2008, Mason sold a limited edition of 195 signed prints of this cover.

In addition to variations on the original design, the album was released in several countries with different artwork. The four-eyed face on the original US album cover was an antique bottle opener.

When the album was released on CD, former Hipgnosis partner Storm Thorgerson had a real-life version of the contraption on the cover made and presented it to Mason. It is still in Mason's office. Both Thorgerson and his assistant, Peter Curzon, came up with the idea after viewing the head sculpture which appeared on the album sleeve of The Division Bell, constructed by John Robertson.

While the 2016 CD reissue by Pink Floyd Records reverted to the original sketch cover, it also contains photographs of the three-dimensional object inside the booklet.

In May 2019, for the 48th anniversary of the album's release, Nick Mason's official Twitter account, as well as the official Pink Floyd Facebook page, posted a fan made animation of the original cover art. This animated tribute was made by Scandinavian artist Alex Teglbjærg, Artist on the border. The animation was used by Nick Mason's Saucerful of Secrets for the Echoes tour of 2022. It was used as the backdrop for the performance of the final song Bike.

Track listing

Side one

Side two

The Capitol reissue of the cassette (4N-16234) is in original order.

Personnel
Pink Floyd
Syd Barrett – lead and rhythm guitar , lead vocals , backing vocals
David Gilmour – lead and rhythm guitar , lead vocals , vocalizations , backing vocals
Nick Mason – drums , percussion, original cover design
Roger Waters – bass guitar , lead vocals , vocalizations , backing vocals
Rick Wright – Farfisa organ , Hammond organ , piano , lead vocals , backing vocals; tack piano , electric harpsichord , Mellotron , vibraphone , trombone , harmonium , celesta , violin 

Additional personnel
James Guthrie – remastering supervision
Norman Smith – drums and backing vocals , drum roll 
Doug Sax – remastering

Charts and certifications

Charts

Certifications

References

Albums produced by David Gilmour
Albums produced by Joe Boyd
Albums produced by Nick Mason
Albums produced by Norman Smith (record producer)
Albums produced by Richard Wright (musician)
Albums produced by Roger Waters
Albums with cover art by Hipgnosis
Albums with cover art by Storm Thorgerson
Pink Floyd compilation albums
1971 compilation albums
Capitol Records compilation albums
EMI Records compilation albums
Harvest Records compilation albums
B-side compilation albums